The Communal Liberation Party (TKP) was a left-wing political party in Northern Cyprus.

History
The TKP was established in 1976 by Alpay Durduran. It won six of the 40 seats in the 1976 elections to the National Council, and 13 seats in the 1981 elections. International he 1985 elections, the party was reduced to ten seats, as the National Council became the Assembly of the Republic and was increased in size to 50 seats.

In the 1990 elections the TKP allied with the Republican Turkish Party and the New Dawn Party to run as the Party for Democratic Struggle. After losing the elections to the ruling National Unity Party, TKP MPs boycotted the Assembly, claiming that Turkey had putting money into the election campaign to support the government.

In the 1993 elections, the party won five seats, and it gained a further two seats in the 1998 elections. For the 2003 elections the party ran as part of the Peace and Democracy Movement, which won six seats. The TKP then ran independently in the 2005 elections, but failed to win a seat.

In May 2007 it merged with the Peace and Democracy Movement to form the Communal Democracy Party.

References

Cypriot nationalism
Defunct political parties in Northern Cyprus
Political parties established in 1976
Political parties disestablished in 2007